In the mathematical theory of compact Lie groups a special role is played by torus subgroups, in particular by the maximal torus subgroups.

A torus in a compact Lie group G is a compact, connected, abelian Lie subgroup of G (and therefore isomorphic to the standard torus Tn). A maximal torus is one which is maximal among such subgroups. That is, T is a maximal torus if for any torus T′ containing T we have T = T′. Every torus is contained in a maximal torus simply by dimensional considerations. A noncompact Lie group need not have any nontrivial tori (e.g. Rn).

The dimension of a maximal torus in G is called the rank of G. The rank is well-defined since all maximal tori turn out to be conjugate. For semisimple groups the rank is equal to the number of nodes in the associated Dynkin diagram.

Examples
The unitary group U(n) has as a maximal torus the subgroup of all diagonal matrices. That is,
 
T is clearly isomorphic to the product of n circles, so the unitary group U(n) has rank n. A maximal torus in the special unitary group SU(n) ⊂ U(n) is just the intersection of T and SU(n) which is a torus of dimension n − 1.

A maximal torus in the special orthogonal group SO(2n) is given by the set of all simultaneous rotations in any fixed choice of n pairwise orthogonal planes (i.e., two dimensional vector spaces). Concretely, one maximal torus consists of all block-diagonal matrices with  diagonal blocks, where each diagonal block is a rotation matrix.
This is also a maximal torus in the group SO(2n+1) where the action fixes the remaining direction. Thus both SO(2n) and SO(2n+1) have rank n. For example, in the rotation group SO(3) the maximal tori are given by rotations about a fixed axis.

The symplectic group Sp(n) has rank n. A maximal torus is given by the set of all diagonal matrices whose entries all lie in a fixed complex subalgebra of H.

Properties
Let G be a compact, connected Lie group and let  be the Lie algebra of G. The first main result is the torus theorem, which may be formulated as follows:
Torus theorem:  If T is one fixed maximal torus in G, then every element of G is conjugate to an element of T. 
This theorem has the following consequences:
 All maximal tori in G are conjugate. 
 All maximal tori have the same dimension, known as the rank of G.
 A maximal torus in G is a maximal abelian subgroup, but the converse need not hold.
Cartan subalgebra)
 Every element of G lies in some maximal torus; thus, the exponential map for G is surjective.
 If G has dimension n and rank r then n − r is even.

Root system
If T is a maximal torus in a compact Lie group G, one can define a root system as follows. Then we say that an element  is a root for G relative to T if  and there exists a nonzero  such that

for all . Here  is a fixed inner product on  that is invariant under the adjoint action of connected compact Lie groups.

The root system, as a subset of the Lie algebra  of T, has all the usual properties of a root system, except that the roots may not span . The root system is a key tool in understanding the classification and representation theory of G.

Weyl group 
Given a torus T (not necessarily maximal), the Weyl group of G with respect to T can be defined as the normalizer of T modulo the centralizer of T. That is, 
 
Fix a maximal torus  in G; then the corresponding Weyl group is called the Weyl group of G (it depends up to isomorphism on the choice of T). 

The first two major results about the Weyl group are as follows.
 The centralizer of T in G is equal to T, so the Weyl group is equal to N(T)/T.
 The Weyl group is generated by reflections about the roots of the associated Lie algebra. Thus, the Weyl group of T is isomorphic to the Weyl group of the root system of the Lie algebra of G.

We now list some consequences of these main results.
 Two elements in T are conjugate if and only if they are conjugate by an element of W. That is, each conjugacy class of G intersects T in exactly one Weyl orbit. In fact, the space of conjugacy classes in G is homeomorphic to the orbit space T/W.
 The Weyl group acts by (outer) automorphisms on T (and its Lie algebra).
 The identity component of the normalizer of T is also equal to T. The Weyl group is therefore equal to the component group of N(T).
 The Weyl group is finite.
The representation theory of G is essentially determined by T and W.

Then  belongs to  if and only if  maps each standard basis element  to a multiple of some other standard basis element , that is, if and only if  permutes the standard basis elements, up to multiplication by some constants. The Weyl group in this case is then the permutation group on  elements.

Weyl integral formula
Suppose f is a continuous function on G. Then the integral over G of f with respect to the normalized Haar measure dg may be computed as follows:
 
An important special case of this result occurs when f is a class function, that is, a function invariant under conjugation. In that case, we have
 
Consider as an example the case , with  being the diagonal subgroup. Then the Weyl integral formula for class functions takes the following explicit form:

 

See also
 Compact group
 Cartan subgroup
 Cartan subalgebra
 Toral Lie algebra
 Bruhat decomposition
 Weyl character formula
 Representation theory of a connected compact Lie group

References

 
 
 
 
 
 
 

Lie groups
Representation theory of Lie groups